GodWeenSatan: The Oneness is the debut studio album by American rock band Ween, released on November 16, 1990, by Twin/Tone Records. The album introduces several key themes for the group, including their eclecticism, gonzo sense of humor, and their demon god/mascot, the Boognish.

Restless Records reissued the album on September 11, 2001, jokingly referring to it as the "25th anniversary edition", despite the album only being eleven years old at the time. The reissue featured digitally remastered sound, new packaging, and the inclusion of three bonus tracks—"Bumblebee Part 2", "Stacey", and "Hippy Smell"—integrated into the original album's playlist. The album contains several tracks that are long time staples of Ween's live performances, such as "You Fucked Up", "Fat Lenny", "Marble Tulip Juicy Tree", and "L.M.L.Y.P." The band performed the album in its entirety on September 14, 2001. The performance was subsequently released on the live album GodWeenSatan Live in 2016.

Background

Writing 
The album was written and performed by Aaron Freeman and Mickey Melchiondo, who had been writing and recording music together five or six years earlier after they met in a middle school typing class at age 14. The duo began creating tapes of their music shortly afterward, as Ween. The apparent earliest GodWeenSatan track, 'I Gots A Weasel,' first appeared on their 1985 Ween WAD' EP in an extended form.

Around 1986 Ween released their first album-length tape, 'The Crucial Squeegie Lip, on Birdo'pray Records. This featured a short version of 'You Fucked Up.'

On January 10, 1987, Ween played their earliest known live show at 'Weenstock,' a small event held in Freeman's basement. Around five months later, they began playing at more prominent venues, such as City Gardens, in Trenton, NJ. Shortly afterward, Ween released their second album-length tape, Ween II (Axis: Bold As Boognish), which featured a slower version of 'Bumblebee.'

In early 1989, Ween played a show at Pranzatelli's Stereo and TV in Bound Brook. The show featured the earliest known versions of several GodWeenSatan songs. These included fully formed versions of 'Tick' & 'Licking the Palm For Guava,' shorter unfinished versions of 'LMLYP' & 'Nan,' and longer versions of 'Don't Laugh (I Love You)' & 'El Camino.' A FM broadcast of Ween playing at The Rathskellar on April 18, 1989, showcases Ween performing exactly half of the album's tracks live. The recording notably features the earliest known performances of 'Never Squeal,' 'Up on the Hill,' 'Cold and Wet,' 'Common Bitch,'' 'Old Queen Cole,' 'Papa Zit,' 'Squelch the Weasel,' 'Wayne's Pet Youngin' & 'Fat Lenny.'

Release 
By the time the album was released in November of 1990, the recordings were at least 11 months old, and the duo had already recorded their second album, The Pod. GodWeenSatan would be Ween's only release on Twin/Tone.

Critical reception

David Browne, writing for Entertainment Weekly, praised the album's silliness and frequently ranting nature, writing: "As it veers uncontrollably from the stupid to the unlistenable, God Ween Satan becomes the energizing sound of two street-corner nutjobs railing as best they can against the entire world. Equal opportunity for clever morons to punish the masses with the aid of modern recording equipment — it’s truly a wonderful thing." Andrew Perry of Select wrote that Ween derived their "sonic dementia" from post-hardcore, but that the band's stylistic range was much wider, including parodies of bubblegum pop and lovers rock. He concluded that the "anarchic" album was "unrealistically varied and never boring. You won't have heard the like of this before".

In a retrospective review, Pitchforks Matt LeMay wrote: "Unafraid to say 'fuck' for no apparent reason, unafraid to rock out on cheesy metal riffs, and unafraid to pick to pieces just about every variety of music, Ween managed to capture the essence of their sound on their debut as well, if not better than, on any later album." Uncut describe the album as containing pastiches of "anything on the rock planet", with Ween offending and delighting the listener "in equal measure". Heather Phares of AllMusic described GodWeenSatan as "almost as eclectic and inspired" as Ween's subsequent albums, with a palpable sense of fun that makes it "more than just a promising debut". Less favorable was Robert Christgau in The Village Voice, who quipped of "L.M.L.Y.P." that Ween "went on about pussy for nine minutes (good idea) in a Princey blues-minstrel drawl (bad one)".

Track listing

All tracks written by Ween except "L.M.L.Y.P.," which contains a partial cover of "Shockadelica" and elements of "Alphabet St." (Prince).

 "Bumblebee Part 2", "Stacey", and "Hippy Smell" do not appear on pressings of the album before 2001.

Personnel
Ween
Gene Ween
Dean Ween

Additional musicians
David Williams – backing vocals on "I'm in the Mood to Move"
Eddie Dingle – vocals on "Nan"
Andrew Weiss – bass guitar

Technical
Andrew Weiss – producer, mixing
Theo Van Rock – mixing
Greg Frey – engineer (drums)

References

1990 debut albums
Ween albums
Twin/Tone Records albums
Indie rock albums by American artists
Lo-fi music albums
Punk rock albums by American artists
Experimental rock albums by American artists